Sampurnanand (1 January 1891 – 10 January 1969) was a teacher and politician in Uttar Pradesh, India. He served as the second Chief Minister of Uttar Pradesh from 1954 to 1960. If single tenures in the office of the Uttar Pradesh Chief Ministers are only considered, then Dr. Sampurnanand had the longest stretch from 28 December 1954 to 7 December 1960, which is almost six years in the office. Dr. Sampurnanand, a scholar of Sanskrit and Hindi, succeeded Govind Ballabh Pant. Advised by a council of ministers numbering 28, he governed Uttar Pradesh was asked to resign as Chief Minister following a political crisis in Uttar Pradesh initiated by Kamlapati Tripathi and Chandra Bhanu Gupta. 

Sampurnanand participated in the Non-cooperation Movement; edited Maryada, a Hindi monthly staffed by Pandit Madan Mohan Malaviya in Benaras, contributed frequently to the National Herald and the Congress Socialist; was elected to the All-India Congress Committee in 1922, became provincial Minister for Education in the Uttar Pradesh cabinet, federal Minister from 1946 to 1951 and from 1951 to 1954, holding portfolios such as education, finance, and home labour; and, became Governor of Rajasthan from April 1962 to April 1967.

The appointment of former Chief Minister of Uttar Pradesh Dr. Sampurnanand as governor of Rajasthan heralded a new beginning in the Indian politics when spent forces in the politics were sent to hold gubernatorial positions.

Life
Sampurnanand was born to a Kayastha family on 1 January 1891 at Benaras (present-day Varanasi) and started life as a teacher. Brought up under the influence of the Benaras ethos, he was a strong votary of traditional culture. He was deeply interested in ancient Hindu culture including Sanskrit and Phalit Jyotish (astrology). His interest in phalit coupled with his academic bent of mind got him interested in astronomy.

Babu Sampurnanandji was also an ardent freedom fighter. His jail-mates narrate that while under confinement in jail (as a freedom fighter) Babuji used to entertain them with discussions on astronomy and acquainted them with the night sky. Babuji had a modern outlook too and in this respect he was a curious mixture of diverse influences.

After Independence, Babu Sampurnanandji became Education Minister in the first popular government of Uttar Pradesh. This was instrumental in fulfilling his  cherished astronomical dreams and drew up plans for establishing an astronomical observatory with a Time unit at the Government Sanskrit College, Benaras (GSC) (now Sampurnanand Sanskrit University).

Sampurnanand as a CM pushed Hindi (also Cow slaughter ban).

As a reformist governor of Rajasthan he promoted the idea of Sanganer’s no-bars prison. In this open prison convicts live with their families, go out to work and pay taxes for water and electricity. Sampurnanand believed that crime should not be looked at as an act of revenge but as an act of reformation. Life imprisonment is like a death sentence for a convict as it results in a separation from family and friends. The Rajasthan government started the Sri Sampurnanand Khula Bandi Shivir (open jail), named after the governor, on an experimental basis in 1963.

References

External links
 Article

1891 births
1969 deaths
Indian socialists
Uttar Pradesh MLAs 1952–1957
Indian National Congress politicians from Uttar Pradesh
Chief Ministers of Uttar Pradesh
Governors of Rajasthan
Founders of Indian schools and colleges
Politicians from Varanasi
Uttar Pradesh MLAs 1957–1962
Chief ministers from Indian National Congress